Gubernatorial elections were held in the Philippines on May 13, 2019. All provinces elected their provincial governors for three-year terms, who will be inaugurated on June 30, 2019 after their proclamation. Governors that are currently serving their third consecutive terms are prohibited from running as governors (they may run for any other posts however).

Highly urbanized cities and independent component cities such as Angeles City, Bacolod, Baguio, Cagayan de Oro, Cebu City, Davao City, Iloilo City and Metro Manila with the municipality of Pateros are outside the jurisdiction of any province and thus do not run elections for governors of their mother provinces (Pampanga, Negros Occidental, Benguet, Misamis Oriental, Cebu, Davao del Sur and Iloilo  for Angeles, Bacolod, Baguio, Cagayan de Oro, Cebu City, Davao City and Iloilo City, respectively). These cities and Pateros elect mayors instead.

Summary

Luzon
Here are the election results as provided by the Commission on Elections (COMELEC) for the provinces in Luzon.

Ilocos Region

Ilocos Norte
Incumbent Governor Imee Marcos is term-limited and is running for Senator. Her mother, former First Lady and incumbent congresswoman Imelda Marcos, is running in her place. On November 29, she withdrew her bid and was replaced by her grandson, Matthew Joseph Manotoc. His opponent is former governor and incumbent congressman Rodolfo Fariñas. On May 2, Fariñas withdrew from the race, leaving Manotoc running unopposed.

Ilocos Sur
Incumbent Governor Ryan Luis Singson is running for reelection.

La Union

Pangasinan
Incumbent Governor Amado Espino III is running for reelection.

Cagayan Valley

Batanes
Incumbent Governor Marilou Cayco is running for reelection.

Cagayan
Incumbent Governor Manuel Mamba is running for reelection.

Isabela
Incumbent Governor Faustino Dy III is term-limited.

Nueva Vizcaya
Incumbent Governor Carlos Padilla is running for reelection.

Quirino
Incumbent governor Junie Cua is term limited.

Cordillera Administrative Region

Abra
Incumbent Governor Ma. Jocelyn Bernos is running for reelection.

Apayao
Incumbent governor Elias Bulut Jr. is term limited and is running for congressman. His sister, incumbent congresswoman Eleonor Bulut Begtang is running in his place unopposed.

Benguet
Incumbent Cresencio Pacalso is running for reelection.

Ifugao
Incumbent Pedro Mayam-O is not running.

Kalinga
Incumbent Jocel Baac is term-limited and is running for congressman.

Mountain Province
Incumbent Bonifacio Lacwasan, Jr. assumed as Governor after the Commission on Elections nullifies the proclamation of Kathy Jill Mayaen. The COMELEC disqualifies Mayaen as substitute candidate of Leonardo Mayaen who died on March 31, 2016. According to COMELEC rules, any independent candidate cannot be substituted in case of death, withdrawal or disqualification.

Central Luzon

Aurora
Incumbent Gerardo Noveras is running for reelection.

Bataan
Incumbent Albert Garcia is running for reelection.

Bulacan

Nueva Ecija
Incumbent governor Czarina Umali is not running. Her brother-in-law, Gil Raymond is running in her place. On November 23, he withdrew his bid and replaced by his brother, former Governor Aurelio Umali.

Pampanga
Incumbent governor Lilia Pineda is term-limited and is running for Vice Governor. Her son, incumbent Vice Governor Dennis Pineda is running in her place.

Tarlac
Incumbent Susan Yap is running for reelection unopposed.

Zambales
Incumbent Amor Deloso is running for reelection against former governor Hermogenes Ebdane.

Calabarzon

Batangas
Incumbent Governor Hermilando Mandanas is running for reelection.

Cavite
Incumbent Governor Jesus Crispin Remulla will not run for reelection.

Laguna
Incumbent Ramil Hernandez is running for reelection, while his predecessor ER Ejercito, was formally disqualified owing to the decision on his corruption case.

Quezon

Rizal
Incumbent Governor Rebecca A. Ynares is running for reelection.

Mimaropa

Marinduque

Occidental Mindoro

Oriental Mindoro

Palawan

Romblon

Bicol Region

Albay

Camarines Norte

Camarines Sur

Catanduanes

Masbate

Sorsogon

Visayas
Here are the election results as provided by the (COMELEC) for the provinces in Visayas.

Western Visayas

Aklan

Antique

Capiz

Guimaras

Iloilo
Incumbent Governor Arthur Defensor Sr. is term-limited and he is set to retire from politics. His son, incumbent congressman Arthur Defensor, Jr. is running in his place.

Negros Occidental

Central Visayas

Bohol
Incumbent governor Edgar Chatto is term-limited and he is running for Congressman.

Cebu

Negros Oriental

Siquijor

Eastern Visayas

Biliran

Eastern Samar

Leyte

Northern Samar

Samar

Southern Leyte

Mindanao
Here are the election results as provided by the (COMELEC) for the provinces in Mindanao.

Zamboanga Peninsula

Zamboanga del Norte
Roberto Escobido Uy was declared nuisance by the COMELEC after carrying the name similar to incumbent Governor Roberto Y. Uy, bringing confusion to voters of the locality.

Zamboanga del Sur

Zamboanga Sibugay

Northern Mindanao

Bukidnon

Camiguin

Lanao del Norte

Misamis Occidental

Misamis Oriental
Incumbent Governor Yevgeny Vincente Emano is running for reelection.

Davao Region

Compostela Valley
Incumbent Governor Jayvee Tyron Uy is running for reelection unopposed.

Davao del Norte

Davao del Sur

Davao Occidental

Davao Oriental

Soccksargen

Cotabato

Sarangani

South Cotabato

Sultan Kudarat

Caraga

Agusan del Norte

Agusan del Sur

Dinagat Islands
Incumbent governor Glenda Ecleo is not running for she is term-limited. Her son, incumbent Vice Governor Benglen Ecleo is running in her place

Surigao del Norte

Surigao del Sur

Bangsamoro Autonomous Region in Muslim Mindanao
This year's elections are the first time people of the five provinces of the Bangsamoro region will elect their respective provincial governors.

Basilan

Lanao del Sur

Maguindanao

Sulu

Tawi-Tawi

Notes

References

2019 Philippine general election
2019
May 2019 events in the Philippines